Boomerang Bay may refer to:

Geography
Boomerang Bay, Bigge Island off the coast of the Kimberley region in Western Australia.

Water parks
The brand 'Boomerang Bay' applied to Cedar Fair properties:
 Boomerang Bay, former name of South Bay Shores water park at California's Great America amusement park
 Boomerang Bay, former name of Carolina Harbor water park at Carowinds amusement park
 Boomerang Bay, former name of Soak City (Kings Island) water park in Mason, Ohio